The 2022–23 Gibraltar Football League season is the fourth season of the Gibraltar Football League in Gibraltar (first under its current name), and the 124th season of football on the territory overall. The league is due to kick off in Autumn 2022. Lincoln Red Imps are the reigning champions, winning their second title in April 2022. Due to the league's fall down the UEFA coefficient rankings, this season only 2 teams will qualify for the UEFA Europa Conference League.

Format
The structure of the league is expected to follow that of the previous three seasons. Teams will play one round of games as a single league, before splitting into two groups: the Championship Group contested by the top 6 sides, and the Challenge Group between the bottom 5 sides. The winners of the Challenge Group will receive the GFA Challenge Trophy and receive a bye to the second round of the next season's Rock Cup.

Teams

The Gibraltar FA announced the clubs who had obtained licences to compete in the 2022–23 season on 17 May 2022. Six clubs were granted UEFA club licences: Bruno's Magpies, Glacis United, Lincoln Red Imps, Lions Gibraltar, Europa and St Joseph's. 5 clubs were granted Gibraltar FA Domestic 'Gold' Licenses: College 1975, Europa Point, Lynx, Manchester 62 and Mons Calpe, who lost their UEFA license. As such, the league is unchanged from the previous season.

Note: Flags indicate national team as has been defined under FIFA eligibility rules. Players may hold more than one non-FIFA nationality.

Managerial Changes

League table

Results

The match between St Joseph's and Mons Calpe on 16 December 2022 originally finished 2–2, but was later awarded as a 3-0 win to St Joseph's.

Championship and Challenge groups

Championship Group

Championship Group results

Challenge Group

Challenge Group results

Season statistics

Top scorers

Hat-tricks

Clean Sheets

See also
2022–23 Gibraltar Intermediate League
2022–23 Gibraltar Women's Football League

References

External links
GFL Website
Gibraltar Football Association

Gibraltar National League seasons
Gib
1